Verulamium Park is a park in St Albans, Hertfordshire. Today the park is owned and operated by St Albans City and District Council.

The park is named after the Roman city of Verulamium on which it stands. The city walls and outline of the main London Gate can still be seen. Archaeological excavations were undertaken in the park during the 1930s by Sir Mortimer Wheeler and his wife Tessa, during which the 1800-year-old hypocaust and its covering mosaic floor were discovered. The Hypocaust Mosaic is on view to the public and currently protected from the elements by a purpose-built building in the park. On the outskirts of the park is Verulamium Museum, which contains hundreds of archaeological objects relating to everyday Roman life in what was a major Roman city. A pub, Ye Olde Fighting Cocks, is also located on the edge of the park. This pub has been listed in the Guinness Book of Records as the oldest such establishment in England.

A main feature of the park is the ornamental lake.  Construction started on this project during 1929, giving much needed work to the unemployed of St Albans during the depression. The lake is fed by the River Ver. The lake is home to a wealth of waterbirds, including mallards, swans, Canada geese, herons, great crested grebes, coots, pochards and tufted ducks.

In the southeastern part of the park, the Westminster Lodge Leisure Centre and Abbey View 9-hole golf course provide a number of sports facilities, including a pool, gym, tennis, fitness classes, running track and football pitch. The park also hosts St Albans parkrun, a free weekly timed 5k event every Saturday morning at 9am.

The northeastern edge of the park abuts St Albans Cathedral and St Albans School, the northwestern edge abuts St Michael's Church, and the southeastern edge abuts St Columba's College. St Albans Abbey railway station is situated just to the east of the park.

The park also hosts a small children's funfair which has been coming there for 46 years. That comes around Easter with the Sun and the summer holidays. It is situated near the hypocaust.

References

External links
 St Albans City and District Council - Verulamium Park
 Friends of Verulamium Park website

Parks and open spaces in Hertfordshire
St Albans
River Ver